Catholicisation refers mainly to the conversion of adherents of other religions into Catholicism, and the system of expanding Catholic influence in politics. Catholicisation was a policy of the Holy See through the Papal States, Holy Roman Empire, Habsburg monarchy, etc. Sometimes this process is referred to as re-Catholicization although in many cases Catholicized people had never been Catholics before.

The term is also used for the communion of Eastern Christian churches into the Roman Catholic Church; the Eastern Catholic Churches that follow the Byzantine, Alexandrian, Armenian, East Syrian, and West Syrian Rites, as opposed to the Roman Catholic Latin Rite.

Catholic doctrine

Propaganda

The Congregation for the Evangelization of Peoples, formerly Sacred Congregation for the Propagation of the Faith is the congregation of the Roman Curia responsible for missionary work and related activities.

In 1439 in Florence, the Declaration of Union was adopted, according to which "the Roman Church firmly believes that nobody, who does not belong to the Catholic Church, not only unbelievers, but Judeans (Jews), nor heretics, nor schismatics, cannot enter the kingdom of heaven, but all will go to the eternal fire, which is saved for devils and their angels, if they not before death turn to that church". The Council of Trent (1545–63) had the mission to gain, apart from "stray" Protestants, also the numerous "schismatics" in southeastern Europe.

Catholicisation and Uniatism

Polish–Lithuanian Commonwealth

During the period from the 16th up to the 18the century, in eastern regions of Polish–Lithuanian Commonwealth and Kingdom of Hungary several successive campaigns of Catholicization were undertaken in order to convert local Eastern Orthodox Christians into Catholicism.

Serbs

The Council of Trent (1545–63) had the mission to gain both Protestants, and Orthodox Christians in southeastern Europe. The Serbian Orthodox Church became targeted, the strongest pressure during the term of Pope Clement VIII (1592–1605), who used the difficult position of the Orthodox in the Ottoman Empire and conditioned the Serbian Patriarch to Uniatize in return for support against the Turks.

Serbian Orthodox Christians and Bogomils were targeted for Catholicisation by clergy from Republic of Ragusa.

Since the many migrations of Serbs into the Habsburg monarchy beginning in the 16th century, there were efforts to Catholicize the community. The Orthodox Eparchy of Marča became the Catholic Eparchy of Križevci after waves of Uniatization in the 17th and 18th centuries. Notable individuals active in the Catholicisation of Serbs in the 17th century include Martin Dobrović, Benedikt Vinković, Petar Petretić, Rafael Levaković, Ivan Paskvali and Juraj Parčić. Catholic bishops Vinković and Petretić wrote numerous inaccurate texts meant to incite hatred against Serbs and Orthodox Christians, some of which included advice on how to Catholicize the Serbs.

During World War II, the Axis Ustashe led the campaign of Genocide of Serbs in the Independent State of Croatia. An estimated 300,000 were converted to Catholicism, most temporarily.

Recatholicisation during Counter-Reformation

See also
 Inquisition
 Proselytism

Christianization by the Papacy
Christianization of Poland 
Christianization of Bohemia

References

Sources

Books
 
 
 
 

Journals
 
 Bourdeaux, M., 1974. The Uniate churches in Czechoslovakia. Religion in Communist Lands, 2(2), pp. 4–6.
 Forster, M.R., The Thirty Years' War and the Failure of Catholicization. The Counter-Reformation: The Essential Readings, pp. 163–97.
 Ionescu, D., 1991. Roumania: The Orthodox-Uniate Conflict. Report on Eastern Europe, 2(31).
 
 
 
 
 

Conference papers